In computer programming, a rope, or cord, is a data structure composed of smaller strings that is used to efficiently store and manipulate a very long string. For example, a text editing program may use a rope to represent the text being edited, so that operations such as insertion, deletion, and random access can be done efficiently.

Description
A rope is a type of binary tree where each leaf (end node) holds a string and a length (also known as a "weight"), and each node further up the tree holds the sum of the lengths of all the leaves in its left subtree. A node with two children thus divides the whole string into two parts: the left subtree stores the first part of the string, the right subtree stores the second part of the string, and a node's weight is the length of the first part.

For rope operations, the strings stored in nodes are assumed to be constant immutable objects in the typical nondestructive case, allowing for some copy-on-write behavior. Leaf nodes are usually implemented as basic fixed-length strings with a reference count attached for deallocation when no longer needed, although other garbage collection methods can be used as well.

Operations
In the following definitions, N is the length of the rope.

Collect Leaves 
 Definition: Create a stack S and a list L.  Traverse down the left-most spine of the tree until you reach a leaf l', adding each node N to S.  Add l' to L. The parent of l' (p) is at the top of the stack.  Repeat the procedure for p's right subtree.

final class InOrderRopeIterator implements Iterator<RopeLike> {

  private final Deque<RopeLike> stack;

  InOrderRopeIterator(@NonNull RopeLike root) {
    stack = new ArrayDeque<>();
    var c = root;
    while (c != null) {
      stack.push(c);
      c = c.getLeft();
    }
  }

  @Override
  public boolean hasNext() {
    return stack.size() > 0;
  }

  @Override
  public RopeLike next() {

    val result = stack.pop();

    if (!stack.isEmpty()) {
      val parent = stack.pop();
      val right = parent.getRight();
      if (right != null) {
        stack.push(right);
        var cleft = right.getLeft();
        while (cleft != null) {
          stack.push(cleft);
          cleft = cleft.getLeft();
        }
      }
    }
    return result;
  }
}

Rebalance 
 Definition: Collect the set of leaves L and rebuild the tree from the bottom-up.

  static boolean isBalanced(RopeLike r) {
    val depth = r.depth();
    if (depth >= FIBONACCI_SEQUENCE.length - 2) {
      return false;
    }
    return FIBONACCI_SEQUENCE[depth + 2] <= r.weight();
  }

  static RopeLike rebalance(RopeLike r) {
    if (!isBalanced(r)) {
      val leaves = Ropes.collectLeaves(r);
      return merge(leaves, 0, leaves.size());
    }
    return r;
  }

  static RopeLike merge(List<RopeLike> leaves) {
    return merge(leaves, 0, leaves.size());
  }

  static RopeLike merge(List<RopeLike> leaves, int start, int end) {
    int range = end - start;
    if (range == 1) {
      return leaves.get(start);
    }
    if (range == 2) {
      return new RopeLikeTree(leaves.get(start), leaves.get(start + 1));
    }
    int mid = start + (range / 2);
    return new RopeLikeTree(merge(leaves, start, mid), merge(leaves, mid, end));
  }

Insert 
 Definition: Insert(i, S’): insert the string S’ beginning at position i in the string s, to form a new string {{math|C1, ..., Ci, S''', Ci + 1, ..., Cm}}.
 Time complexity: .

This operation can be done by a Split() and two Concat() operations. The cost is the sum of the three.
  public Rope insert(int idx, CharSequence sequence) {
    if (idx == 0) {
      return prepend(sequence);
    }
    if (idx == length()) {
      return append(sequence);
    }
    val lhs = base.split(idx);
    return new Rope(Ropes.concat(lhs.fst.append(sequence), lhs.snd));
  }
 Index 

 Definition: Index(i): return the character at position i Time complexity: 

To retrieve the i-th character, we begin a recursive search from the root node:

  @Override
  public int indexOf(char ch, int startIndex) {
    if (startIndex > left.weight()) {
      return right.indexOf(ch, startIndex - left.weight());
    }
    return left.indexOf(ch, startIndex);
  }

Then because 6 is greater than 1 and there's a left child, go to the left child (G). 2 is greater than 1 and there's a left child, so go to the left child again (J). Finally 2 is greater than 1 but there is no left child, so the character at index 1 of the short string "na" (ie "n") is the answer. (1-based index)

 Concat 

 Definition: Concat(S1, S2): concatenate two ropes, S1 and S2, into a single rope.
 Time complexity:  (or  time to compute the root weight)

The weight of the parent node is set to the length of the left child S1, which would take  time, if the tree is balanced.

As most rope operations require balanced trees, the tree may need to be re-balanced after concatenation.

 Split 

 Time complexity: 

There are two cases that must be dealt with:
 The split point is at the end of a string (i.e. after the last character of a leaf node)
 The split point is in the middle of a string.

The second case reduces to the first by splitting the string at the split point to create two new leaf nodes, then creating a new node that is the parent of the two component strings.

For example, to split the 22-character rope pictured in Figure 2.3 into two equal component ropes of length 11, query the 12th character to locate the node K at the bottom level. Remove the link between K and G. Go to the parent of G and subtract the weight of K from the weight of D. Travel up the tree and remove any right links to subtrees covering characters past position 11, subtracting the weight of K from their parent nodes (only node D and A, in this case). Finally, build up the newly orphaned nodes K and H by concatenating them together and creating a new parent P with weight equal to the length of the left node K.

As most rope operations require balanced trees, the tree may need to be re-balanced after splitting.

  public Pair<RopeLike, RopeLike> split(int index) {
    if (index < weight) {
      val split = left.split(index);
      return Pair.of(rebalance(split.fst), rebalance(new RopeLikeTree(split.snd, right)));
    } else if (index > weight) {
      val split = right.split(index - weight);
      return Pair.of(rebalance(new RopeLikeTree(left, split.fst)), rebalance(split.snd));
    } else {
      return Pair.of(left, right);
    }
  }

 Delete 
 Definition: Delete(i, j): delete the substring , from s to form a new string .
 Time complexity: .

This operation can be done by two Split() and one Concat() operation. First, split the rope in three, divided by i-th and i+j-th character respectively, which extracts the string to delete in a separate node. Then concatenate the other two nodes.

  @Override
  public RopeLike delete(int start, int length) {
    val lhs = split(start);
    val rhs = split(start + length);
    return rebalance(new RopeLikeTree(lhs.fst, rhs.snd));
  }

 Report 
 Definition: Report(i, j): output the string .
 Time complexity: 

Output  by doing an in-order traversal of T starting at node u.

Comparison with monolithic arrays

Advantages:
 Ropes enable much faster insertion and deletion of text than monolithic string arrays, on which operations have time complexity O(n).
 Ropes don't require O(n) extra memory when operated upon (arrays need that for copying operations).
 Ropes don't require large contiguous memory spaces.
 If only nondestructive versions of operations are used, rope is a persistent data structure. For the text editing program example, this leads to an easy support for multiple undo levels.

Disadvantages:
 Greater overall space use when not being operated on, mainly to store parent nodes. There is a trade-off between how much of the total memory is such overhead and how long pieces of data are being processed as strings. The strings in example figures above are unrealistically short for modern architectures. The overhead is always O(n), but the constant can be made arbitrarily small.
 Increase in time to manage the extra storage
 Increased complexity of source code; greater risk of bugs

This table compares the algorithmic traits of string and rope implementations, not their raw speed''.  Array-based strings have smaller overhead, so (for example) concatenation and split operations are faster on small datasets. However, when array-based strings are used for longer strings, time complexity and memory use for inserting and deleting characters becomes unacceptably large. In contrast, a rope data structure has stable performance regardless of data size. Further, the space complexity for ropes and arrays are both O(n). In summary, ropes are preferable when the data is large and modified often.

See also
 The Cedar programming environment, which used ropes "almost since its inception"
 The Model T enfilade, a similar data structure from the early 1970s.
 Gap buffer, a data structure commonly used in text editors that allows efficient insertion and deletion operations clustered near the same location
 Piece table, another data structure commonly used in text editors

References

External links

"absl::Cord" implementation of ropes within The Abseil library
"C cords" implementation of ropes within the Boehm Garbage Collector library
SGI C++ specification for ropes (supported by STLPort and libstdc++)
Ropes for C#
ropes for Common Lisp
Ropes for Java
String-Like Ropes for Java
Ropes for JavaScript
Ropes for Limbo
ropes for Nim
Ropes for OCaml
pyropes for Python
Ropes for Smalltalk
SwiftRope for Swift
"Ropey" for Rust

Binary trees
String data structures